TIMOCOM GmbH with head office in Erkrath is a German IT and freight technology company. TIMOCOM is the operator of Europe’s first Smart Logistics System. It was founded in 1997 and sees itself as an IT service provider for all companies involved in transport. Its flagship product is a freight exchange.

TIMOCOM has representative offices in Poland, Czech Republic, Hungary and branches in Spain and France. The company achieved turnover of €74.6 million in the 2018 financial year. TIMOCOM employs more than 500 employees from over 30 different countries.
TIMOCOM is one of the market leaders in Europe with its freight and vehicle exchange, originally TC Truck&Cargo. This exchange regulates supply and demand in transport services through its own online marketplace. TIMOCOM has offered its networked applications, services and interfaces within the Smart Logistics System since 2018. TIMOCOM has been awarded the title “Best Brand” in the “Freight Exchange” category every year in the reader’s vote of ETM-Verlag (publishing house) since 2008.  The company’s products and services are offered in 44 European countries and in 24 languages.

History 
It was founded in 1997 as TimoCom Soft- und Hardware GmbH by the entrepreneurs Jens Thiermann and Jürgen Moorbrink as well as the software developers Gunther Matzaitis and Oliver Schubert. The first part of the company name "Timo" was created from the first letters of the two first-mentioned founders. The company presented the freight, and vehicle exchange TC Truck&Cargo as its first product which enabled users to provide freight or transport vehicles digitally and avoid cost-intensive empty runs.

TIMOCOM extended its offering in the years that followed to an extensive transport platform.  Amongst others, applications for cost calculation, route planning, vehicle tracking, assigning storage spaces and long-term transport tenders were developed.  

TIMOCOM went online in 2006 and enabled users to place offers in real time. This step changed the processes of logistics company extensively in Europe. 

Due to the fact that hundreds of thousands of offers were placed on the TIMOCOM transport platform on a daily basis, the decision was taken to provide the relationship of supply and demand as a new online service in 2009. The transport barometer is now used by many companies as a controlling factor for their pricing. 

The company head office was relocated to Erkrath in 2014. A second building complex was added in 2017.

Jens Thiermann handed over the operational management to his son Tim Thiermann, Managing Partner, in 2019. Since then, he has managed the company alongside Sebastian Lehnen, Member of the Executive Board.

Products 
Smart Logistics System 
The Smart Logistics System combines different applications for the digital support of transport processes with a logistics network consisting of more than 43,000 certified companies all over Europe.  The Smart Logistics System can be connected with existing logistics and telematics systems via individual interfaces. The system also offers various services.

Applications
  Freight and vehicle exchange (freight exchange)
  Warehouse
  Transport orders
  Quote requests
  Tenders
  Tracking
  Routes & costs
  Company profiles
Interfaces
  Freight exchange
  Transport orders
  Tracking
Services
  Security net
  International debt collection service
  Update Pool

References

External links
TimoCom's website

Transport companies of Germany
Multinational companies
Online marketplaces of Germany